Coihueco is a Chilean commune and city in Punilla Province, Ñuble Region. It is located near Chillán, the provincial capital. Coihueco borders San Carlos and San Fabián on the north, Argentina on the east, Pinto on the South, and Chillán on the west.

Demographics
Of these, 7,230 (30.7%) lived in urban areas and 16,353 (69.3%) in rural areas. The population grew by 4.4% (998 persons) between the 1992 and 2002 censuses.

Administration
As a commune, Coihueco is a third-level administrative division of Chile administered by a municipal council, headed by an alcalde who is directly elected every four years. The 2008-2012 alcalde is Arnoldo Manuel Jiménez Venegas (PPD).

Within the electoral divisions of Chile, Coihueco is represented in the Chamber of Deputies by Carlos Abel Jarpa  (PRSD) and Rosauro Martínez (RN) as part of the 41st electoral district, together with Chillán, Pinto, San Ignacio, El Carmen, Pemuco, Yungay and Chillán Viejo. The commune is represented in the Senate by Victor Pérez Varela (UDI) and Mariano Ruiz-Esquide Jara (PDC) as part of the 13th senatorial constituency (Biobío-Coast).

References 

 Wikipedia, la enciclopedia libre, Coihueco
Coihueco, Chile Page. Falling Rain Genomics. Retrieved on 2008-05-02.

External links
  Municipality of Coihueco

Communes of Chile
Populated places in Punilla Province